Discaria toumatou, commonly called matagouri, tūmatakuru or wild Irishman, is a tangle-branched thorny plant endemic to New Zealand. 

Matagouri is a tangle-branched, extremely thorny, divaricating shrub or small tree up to five metres tall. It has small leathery leaves close to the thorns, which are only abundant in spring or the shade. The flowers are tiny and white with no petals. It is the only New Zealand native plant that has thorns.

It is most common in tussock grassland, stony areas and river beds. It is common in the eastern South Island, and found in a few coastal localities in the North Island south from the mouth of the Waikato River. As with other Discaria species it fixes nitrogen from the atmosphere with the help of symbiotic bacteria of the genus Frankia in its roots. It often grows in association with mingimingi (Coprosma propinqua), porcupine shrub (Melicytus alpinus, an alpine mahoe), native brooms (Carmichaelia species) and the introduced sweet briar (Rosa rubiginosa), the last a weed.

As a native plant matagouri has complete protection on public conservation land and a degree of protection on private land under the Resource Management Act 1991. In a notable case a 400 ha area of matagouri forest, including trees that may have been 150 years old, was illegally sprayed at the head of Lake Sumner in 2001.

Etymology 
The name matagouri is how speakers of English heard the South Island pronunciation of the Māori name "matakoura".

References

Flora of the North Island
Flora of the South Island
Trees of New Zealand
toumatou